This was the first edition of the event.

Martin Damm and Anders Järryd won the title, defeating Jakob Hlasek and Yevgeny Kafelnikov 6–4, 6–2 in the final.

Seeds

Draw

Draw

External links
Draw

St. Petersburg Open
St. Petersburg Open
1995 in Russian tennis